Bucetin (INN, BAN) is an analgesic and antipyretic that is no longer marketed.  Chemically, it is similar to phenacetin with which it shares the risk of carcinogenesis.  Bucetin was withdrawn from use in 1986 due to renal toxicity.

See also 
 Analgesic nephropathy
 List of withdrawn drugs

References 

Analgesics
Antipyretics
Anilides
Withdrawn drugs